Religious behaviours are behaviours motivated by religious beliefs. Religious actions are also called 'ritual' and religious avoidances are called taboos or ritual prohibitions.

Actions

The two best known religious actions are prayer and sacrifice. The most general religious action is prayer. It can be done quietly by a person all alone, but people can also pray in groups using songs. Sacrifice is also a widely spread religious action. Prayer and sacrifice often form the basis of other, more complicated religious actions like pilgrimage, processions, or consulting an oracle. Many rituals are connected to a certain purpose, like initiation, ritual purification and preparation for an important happening or task. Among these are also the so-called rituals of transition, which occur at important moments of the human life cycle, like birth, adulthood/marriage, sickness and death. A special religious action is spirit possession and religious ecstasy. Religious specialists, such as priests, vicars, rabbis, imams and pandits are involved in many religious actions.

Avoidances

A religious avoidance is when a person desists from something or from some action for religious reasons. It can be food or drink that one does not touch because of one's religion for some time (fast). This abstinence can also be for a longer time. Some people do not have sex (celibacy). Or one avoids contact with blood, or dead animals. Well known examples are: Jews and Muslims do not eat pork; the celibacy of Catholic priests; the purity rules of Hinduism and Judaism; the Word of Wisdom (which teaches to avoid alcohol, coffee, tea, etc.) of the Church of Jesus Christ of Latter-day Saints.

These avoidances, or 'taboos', are often about food and drink.
 speech; some words are forbidden (cursing)
 dying, death and mourning

Religious avoidances are often not easily recognisable as (part of) religious behaviour. When asked, the believers often do not motivate this kind of behaviour explicitly as religious but say the avoidance for health reasons, ethical reasons, or because it is hygienic.

Academic study

Religious behaviour is seldom studied for itself. When it is given attention at all, it is usually studied as an illustration of the religious images, like in comparative religion and cultural anthropology, or as part of the study of man in the social sciences.

Behaviour in church

Catholic 
Jean-Baptiste Massillon gives a lengthy sermon on the verse,  
"And Jesus went into the temple of God, and cast out all them that sold and bought in the temple, and overthrew the tables of the money-changers, and the seats of them that sold doves." (Matthew 21:12) stating that "of all crimes, in effect, by which the greatness of God is insulted, I see almost none more deserving of his chastisements than the profanations of his temples; and they are so much the more criminal, as the dispositions required of us by religion, when assisting there, ought to be more holy."

There are a number of etiquette rules which would include showing up about five or 10 minutes early to allow some time of prayer and "to be ready to participate in the Mass."

See also
 Discipline
 Elitism
 New religious movement
 Piety
 Revivalism
 Secondary conversion

References

External links
 The study of religious behaviour, by J.P. Janssen
 Sociology of Religion Resources